George Lamson may refer to:

 George Henry Lamson (1852–1882), English doctor and murderer hanged in 1882
 George E. Lamson, football coach for the Connecticut Huskies
 George Lamson Jr., sole survivor of the Galaxy Airlines Flight 203 crash in 1985